David Muñoz (born 29 September 1964) is a Panamanian sports shooter. He competed in the men's 10 metre air pistol event at the 2016 Summer Olympics.

References

External links
 

1964 births
Living people
Panamanian male sport shooters
Olympic shooters of Panama
Shooters at the 2016 Summer Olympics
Place of birth missing (living people)
Pan American Games competitors for Panama
Shooters at the 2015 Pan American Games
Shooters at the 2019 Pan American Games
20th-century Panamanian people
21st-century Panamanian people